Mubisa power station is a small hydroelectric power station in Ernen, Switzerland. It is the first power station commissioned by Gommerkraftwerke AG.
It was commissioned in 1964 and has two 13MW pelton turbines.

References

Hydroelectric power stations in Switzerland
Energy infrastructure completed in 1964
20th-century architecture in Switzerland